The Pureha-class (プレハ) locomotives were a group of steam tank locomotives with 2-6-2 wheel arrangement of used by the Chosen Government Railway (Sentetsu) in Korea. The "Pure" name came from the American naming system for steam locomotives, under which locomotives with 2-6-2 wheel arrangement were called "Prairie".

In all, Sentetsu owned 227 locomotives of all Pure classes, whilst privately owned railways owned another 52; of these 279 locomotives, 169 went to the Korean National Railroad in South Korea and 110 to the Korean State Railway in North Korea.

Description
The プレハ (Pureha) class was the eighth and final class of 2-6-2 locomotives procured by Sentetsu. They were designed by Sentetsu as the most advanced locomotives in Korea at the time of their introduction, and the first twelve were built in 1932 by the Gyeongsong Works. A further 26 were built in 1939 by Hitachi and Kisha Seizō and assembled at Sentetsu's Busan shops. They were frequently used for express trains on the Gyeongin Line.

Postwar

After the end of the Pacific War and the subsequent partition of Korea, these locomotives were divided between North and South Korea.

Korean National Railroad 푸러8 (Pureo8) class
Many Pureha class locomotives were used by the Korean National Railroad after Liberation, which designated them 푸러8 (Pureo8) class; they were used by the KNR primarily for shunting duties, and on light local and suburban passenger services.

Korean State Railway 부러파 (Purŏp'a) class/1800 series
The Sentetsu Purena class locomotives that remained in the North after the partition of Korea were operated by the Korean State Railway, designating them 부러파 (Purŏp'a) class, and later renumbering them into the 1800 series around the early 1970s. The total number and identities of the engines that went north is uncertain, but it is known プレハ38 had gone to the north, where it was in use around Hamheung in 1951, still carrying Sentetsu number plates and emblems. It is unknown whether the locomotive remained in the North after the Korean War, or if it was taken by UN forces during the withdrawal.

Construction

References

Locomotives of Korea
Locomotives of North Korea
Locomotives of South Korea
Steam locomotives of China
2-6-2 locomotives
Gyeongseong Works locomotives
Hitachi locomotives
Kisha Seizo locomotives
Passenger locomotives